Großrußbach is a town in the district of Korneuburg in Lower Austria in Austria

Geography
It lies about 17 km north of Korneuburg hin the Weinviertel in Lower Austria. About 14.2 percent of the municipality is forested.

References

External links
 Bisamberg Homepage

Cities and towns in Korneuburg District